Oleg Elekpayevich Saitov ((born May 26, 1974 in Novokuybyshevsk, Russian SFSR to a Volga Tatar father and ethnic Russian mother) is a Russian former Olympic boxer.

He won the Olympic gold medal at the 1996 and 2000 Summer Olympics in the welterweight division, and bronze medal in the 2004 Olympics. Saitov was the winner of the Val Barker Trophy for Outstanding Boxer at the 2000 Olympic Games. In 2004, he won the title at the 2004 European Amateur Boxing Championships in Pula, Croatia.

Olympic results 
1996 Olympic Results
Round of 32:Defeated Cahit Sume of Turkey - PTS (11-1)
Round of 16:Defeated Ho-Jo Bae of South Korea -PTS (9-5)
Quarterfinal:Defeated Kamel Chater of Tunisia - PTS (9-3)
Semifinal:Defeated Daniel Santos of Puerto Rico - PTS (13-11)
Final:Defeated Juan Hernandez Sierra of Cuba - PTS (14-9)

2000 Olympic Results
Round of 16:Defeated Francisco Calderon of Colombia - PTS (15-1)
Quarterfinal:Defeated Ruslan Khairov of Azerbaijan - PTS (10-10; 55-47)
Semifinal:Defeated Dorel Simion of Romania - PTS (19-10)
Final:Defeated Serhiy Dotsenko of Ukraine- PTS (24-16)

2004 Olympic Results
Round of 32:Defeated Ait Hammi Miloud of Morocco - PTS (30-15)
Round of 16:Defeated Mohamed Hikal of Egypt - PTS (18-17)
Quarterfinal:Defeated Sherzod Husanov of Uzbekistan - PTS (22-14)
Semifinal:Lost to Bakhtiyar Artayev of Kazakhstan - PTS (18-20)

References

External links
 
 

1974 births
Living people
People from Novokuybyshevsk
Olympic boxers of Russia
Olympic gold medalists for Russia
Olympic bronze medalists for Russia
Boxers at the 1996 Summer Olympics
Boxers at the 2000 Summer Olympics
Boxers at the 2004 Summer Olympics
Olympic medalists in boxing
Russian male boxers
Tatar people of Russia
AIBA World Boxing Championships medalists
Medalists at the 2004 Summer Olympics
Medalists at the 2000 Summer Olympics
Medalists at the 1996 Summer Olympics
Welterweight boxers
Sportspeople from Samara Oblast